Lenaerts and Lenaers are Dutch patronymic surnames most common in Belgium. Lenaert is an archaic Dutch form of Leonard. People with this surname include:

Lenaerts
 (born 1987), Belgian harpist, sister of Wouter
 (1923–2006), Belgian sculptor and painter
Koen Lenaerts (born 1953), Belgian judge, President of the European Court of Justice
Toon Lenaerts (born 1983), Belgian football defender 
 (born 1981), Belgian conductor and composer, brother of Anneleen
Yves Lenaerts (born 1990), Belgian football goalkeeper 
Lenaers
Anja Lenaers (born 1972), Belgian racing cyclist
Jeroen Lenaers (born 1984), Dutch CDA politician and MEP 
Roger Lenaers (born 1925), Belgian Jesuit pastor in Austria
Victor Lenaers (1893–1968), Belgian racing cyclist
William M. Lenaers (born c.1950), United States Army general

See also
Bram Leenards (born 1940), Dutch water polo player
Johan Lennarts (1923–1991), Dutch painter and sculptor
Sint-Lenaarts, village in the community of Brecht, Antwerp
Lennart, a surname and given name

References

Dutch-language surnames
Patronymic surnames
Surnames of Belgian origin
Surnames from given names